is a Japanese animation studio established on October 4, 1978. It is noted for anime series including Spirit of Wonder, Absolute Boy, Izetta: The Last Witch, and several others, including the long-running NHK series Nintama Rantarō. Its name can be translated as "Hall of Asia."

History
The studio was founded in 1978 by the noted animators Tsutomu Shibayama, Osamu Kobayashi and Michishiro Yamada, former members of the animation studio A Production, under the corporate title . The name Ajiadō is a penname used by Tsutomu Shibayama and Osamu Kobayashi.

In 1985, it formally became a kabushiki gaisha (business corporation). In 1987, it produced its first series, the OVA . It established the company  in 1990. In 1998, the studio established a digital animation division to produce its digital animation.

In 2005, the studio produced Zettai Shōnen, which was directed by Tomomi Mochizuki and premiered on NHK BS2. In 2007, it produced Emma – A Victorian Romance: Second Act, the second season of Emma – A Victorian Romance.

Works

Television series
Miracle Girls (1993)
Nintama Rantarō (1993–present)
Wankorobe (1996–1997)
Kaiketsu Zorori (2004–2005)
Majime ni Fumajime Kaiketsu Zorori (2005–2007)
Absolute Boy (2005)
Kujibiki Unbalance (2006)
Emma – A Victorian Romance: Second Act (2007)
DD Fist of the North Star (2013–2015)
Hokuto no Ken: Ichigo Aji (2015)
Izetta: The Last Witch (2016)
How Not to Summon a Demon Lord (2018)
Ascendance of a Bookworm (2019–2022)
Kakushigoto (2020)
Motto! Majime ni Fumajime Kaiketsu Zorori (2020–present)
Kemono Jihen (2021)
Revenger (2023)

Films
Kakkun Cafe (September 22, 1984)
Maison Ikkoku: Kanketsuhen (February 6, 1988) - Television film
J League o 100-bai Tanoshiku Miru Hōhō!! (June 11, 1994)
Eiga Nintama Rantarō (June 29, 1996)
Donguri no Ie (1997)
Majime ni Fumajime Kaiketsu Zorori: Nazo no Otakara Daisakusen (March 11, 2006)
You Are Umasou (October 16, 2010)
Gekijō-ban Anime Nintama Rantarō Ninjutsu Gakuen Zenin Shutsudō! no Dan (March 12, 2011)
Magic Tree House (October 23, 2011)
Kaiketsu Zorori Da-Da-Da-Daibouken! (December 22, 2012)
Kaiketsu Zorori: Mamoru ze! Kyouryuu no Tamago (December 14, 2013)
Kaiketsu Zorori: Uchū no Yūsha-tachi (September 12, 2015)
Eiga Kaiketsu Zorori ZZ no Himitsu (November 22, 2017)
Seven Days War (2019)
Kakushigoto (July 9, 2021) - Compilation film

OVAs/ONAs
Time Knot: Reflection (1987)
Shiratori Reiko de Gozaimasu! (1990)
Spirit of Wonder: Chaina-san no Yūutsu (1992)
Yokohama Kaidashi Kikō (1998)
Azumanga Web Daioh (2000)
Spirit of Wonder (2001–2004)
Yokohama Kaidashi Kikō: Quiet Country Cafe (2002–2003)
Kujibiki Unbalance (2004–2005; production by Palm Studio)
Genshiken (2006–2007)
Ascendance of a Bookworm (2020)

Noted staff

Directors

Screenwriters

References

External links
 Official site 
 

 
Japanese animation studios
Mass media in Saitama (city)
Companies based in Saitama Prefecture
Mass media companies established in 1978
Japanese companies established in 1978